The 2008 Tandridge District Council election took place on 1 May 2008 to elect members of Tandridge District Council in Surrey, England. One third of the council was up for election and the Conservative Party stayed in overall control of the council.

After the election, the composition of the council was:
Conservative 33
Liberal Democrat 8
Independent 1

Campaign
Before the election the Conservatives controlled the council with 31 seats, while the Liberal Democrats were the main opposition with 9 councillors. This was after Liberal Democrat councillor Sakina Bradbury of Whyteleafe ward defected to the Conservatives in February 2008. 14 of the 42 seats on the council were being contested by a total of 45 candidates, with 3 of the sitting councillors not defending seats. The Conservatives contested all 14 seats, compared to 13 Liberal Democrat candidates, 9 Labour Party, 6 UK Independence Party and 1 for the Green Party.

Issues at the election included housing, with Labour calling for more affordable housing, while both the UK Independence Party and Green Party had concerns over the number of houses being built. Other issues included recycling, with the Conservatives pointing to the weekly refuse collection that the council ran, council tax and leisure facilities.

Election result
The Conservative party retained control of the council and made a net gain of 2 seats to have 42 councillors. The Conservatives gained Queens Park and Warlingham East, Chelsham and Farleigh from the Liberal Democrats and Valley from independent Peter Longhurst. The leader of the council, Conservative Gordon Keymer, said that it had been "a good night for us". However the Conservatives did lose Westway to the Liberal Democrats by 88 votes, which left the Liberal Democrats with 8 seats and there was 1 independent councillor. Overall turnout at the election was 42.3%.

Ward results

By-elections between 2008 and 2010

Godstone

Whyteleafe
A by-election was held in Whyteleafe on 2 February 2010 after Liberal Democrat councillor Jeffrey Gray resigned from the council when he moved away from Tandridge. The seat was held for the Liberal Democrats by David Lee with 57% of the vote.

References

2008
2008 English local elections
2000s in Surrey